In telecommunication, the term security kernel has the following meanings: 

In computer and communications security, the central part of a computer or communications system hardware, firmware, and software that implements the basic security procedures for controlling access to system resources. 
A self-contained usually small collection of key security-related statements that (a) works as a part of an operating system to prevent unauthorized access to, or use of, the system and (b) contains criteria that must be met before specified programs can be accessed. 
Hardware, firmware, and software elements of a trusted computing base that implement the reference monitor concept.

References

National Information Systems Security Glossary

Computing terminology